The Russell–Brasstown Scenic Byway is a National Scenic Byway in the U.S. state of Georgia that includes parts of Georgia State Route 17 (SR 17), SR 75, SR 180, and SR 75 Alternate, as well as the entire length of SR 348.

Surrounded by the beauty of the Chattahoochee-Oconee National Forest, the byway winds through the valleys and mountain gaps of the southern Appalachian Mountains. From the vistas atop Brasstown Bald to the cooling mists of waterfalls, scenic wonders fill this region.

Route description
The byway forms a loop starting northwest of Helen, at the junction of SR 17/SR 75 and SR 75 Alternate. From there, it follows SR 17/SR 75 north to a junction with SR 180 in the Chattahoochee-Oconee National Forest. The byway turns west on SR 180 with an optional detour to the Brasstown Bald Visitor Center on SR 180 Spur. It follows SR 180 westward and southwestward to SR 348 (Richard B. Russell Scenic Highway) in Choestoe and then southeast back to SR 75 Alternate before turning northeast, back to SR 17/SR 75.

Russell–Brasstown Scenic Byway is not part of the National Highway System, a system of roadways important to the nation's economy, defense, and mobility.

History
As stated above, the Russell–Brasstown Scenic Byway is composed of parts or entire lengths of numbered routes. The portion of SR 75 included in the byway was established between May and August 1932 along the same alignment as it travels today. By July 1939, this section of SR 75 was converted from "completed grading, not surfaced" to "completed semi-hard surface". By 1941, a short section northwest of the SR 75 Alternate was paved. By July of that year, the former southern segment of SR 66 was established from the current SR 17/SR 75/SR 180 intersection to the current SR 180/SR 180 Spur intersection. Also, SR 180 was established from the latter intersection westward to an intersection with US 19/US 129/SR 11 west of Choestoe. By the end of 1946, the above-mentioned segment of SR 75 was paved. Between 1950 and 1952, SR 17 was designated along SR 75. Between 1960 and 1963, SR 66 from SR 17/SR 75 to SR 180 was paved. By 1966, the byway's entire segment of SR 180 was paved. Also, SR 348 was established in two parts. The southern part began at an intersection with SR 356 (what is now SR 75 Alternate) to the White–Union county line. The northern part existed south and southeast of Choestoe, intersecting with SR 348 in Choestoe. Later that year, both parts of SR 348 were connected, and the entire byway was paved. By 1982, SR 356 was redesignated as SR 75 Alternate. Later that year, upon the decommissioning of SR 66, that segment of the bypass was redesignated as an eastward extension of SR 180.

The Russell–Brasstown Scenic Byway was designated as a National Forest Scenic Byway on June 5, 1989. It was later named a Georgia State Scenic Byway in 1992 and a National Scenic Byway on  June 15, 2000.

Major intersections
These intersections begin in the southeast and travel in a counter-clockwise direction.

See also
 
 
 North Georgia mountains

References

External links
 
 USDA Forest Service Chattahoochee-Oconee National Forest site

National Scenic Byways
Transportation in White County, Georgia
Transportation in Towns County, Georgia
Transportation in Union County, Georgia
National Forest Scenic Byways
Tourist attractions in White County, Georgia
Chattahoochee-Oconee National Forest